Kovalevskaya Prize is a national scientific prize awarded by Russian Academy of Sciences for outstanding achievements in mathematics since 1997 in honor of Sofya Kovalevskaya.

Kovalevskaya Prize winners 

 O. A. Ladyzhenskaya, 1992
 N. M. Ivochkina, 1997
 V. V. Kozlov, 1999
 G. A. Seregin, 2003
 S. V. Manakov and V. V. Sokolov, 2007 
 A. B. Bogatyrev, 2009 
 A. V. Borisov and I. S. Mamaev, 2012
 A. I. Bufetov, 2015 
 I. A. Taimanov, 2018

References 

Mathematics awards
Awards of the Russian Academy of Sciences